Clathrus xiningensis is a species of fungus in the stinkhorn family. Found in China, it was described as new to science in 1994.

References

External links

Phallales
Fungi described in 1994
Fungi of China